The Story So Far: The Very Best of Rod Stewart is Rod Stewart's career-retrospective compilation album released in 2001. The album summarises his solo work beginning with material from his 1971 breakthrough album Every Picture Tells a Story until his 2001 album Human. For contractual reasons, only two songs from his Mercury Records tenure ("Maggie May" and "You Wear It Well") were included (a third song from the Mercury era, "Reason to Believe", was included in a live acoustic version from the Warner Bros. album Unplugged...and Seated). The rest of the material is from different albums released under Warner Bros. Records.

The compilation was particularly notable for dividing the songs between rock and pop tunes on the first disc (A Night Out) and love songs on the second disc (A Night In). Also, even though most of the songs included on the album enjoyed big success (29 out of the 34 songs originally reached the Top 10 in the United Kingdom and/or the United States), many hit singles were missed-out, including US Top 10 hits as "Passion", "Infatuation", "Handbags and Gladrags" and "My Heart Can't Tell You No".

In the United States the album was released separately as The Voice: The Very Best of Rod Stewart and Encore: The Very Best of Rod Stewart Vol. 2, though there are some differences in the content.  Warner Bros. Records released The Story So Far on 12 November 2001 (see 2001 in British music) and the next day The Voice was released. On 26 August 2003 (see 2003 in music) Encore was released.

Track listing

The Story So Far

US version

Charts

Weekly charts

Year-end charts

Certifications

References

2001 greatest hits albums
2003 greatest hits albums
Albums produced by Bernard Edwards
Albums produced by Trevor Horn
Albums produced by Tom Dowd
Albums produced by Michael Omartian
Rod Stewart compilation albums
Warner Records compilation albums